Stephen Robertson (born 14 February 1962) is an Australian politician, he is a former member of the Legislative Assembly of Queensland who represented the electoral district of Stretton for the Labor Party. He was the Minister for Natural Resources, Mines and Energy and Minister for Trade in the cabinet of Premier Anna Bligh. He had previously held the positions of Minister for Health (2005–2009) and Minister for Emergency Services (1999–2001).

Early life
Robertson was born in Aberdeen, Scotland. He graduated from Griffith University with a Bachelor of Arts with honours from the School of Modern Asian Studies. He joined the Labor Party in 1978, and prior to his election to parliament was State Secretary and National President of the United Firefighters Union of Australia.

Political career
He was first elected to the Queensland Parliament in the 1992 Queensland state election for the new electoral district of Sunnybank. He was appointed to Peter Beattie's cabinet as Minister for Emergency Services on 16 December 1999. From 22 February 2001 he was transferred to the Natural Resources and Mines portfolios, also taking on the Energy portfolio from 12 February 2004. On 28 July 2005 he became Minister for Health, but resumed his former position of Minister for Natural Resources, Mines, Energy and Trade after a cabinet reshuffle in March 2009. In 2011 he was appointed Minister for Energy and Water Utilities.

He is a member of Labor's left-wing faction, and at one stage had Graham Perrett, the current federal Member for Moreton, working for him. He retired prior to the 2012 Queensland state election. Labor preselection in his seat of Stretton was subsequently won by Duncan Pegg, but the seat was won by the LNP's Freya Ostapovitch.

References

External links
StephenRobertsonMP.com – personal website

1962 births
Living people
Members of the Queensland Legislative Assembly
Scottish emigrants to Australia
Australian Labor Party members of the Parliament of Queensland
Griffith University alumni
21st-century Australian politicians